Ashina Yuanqing (r. 685–692) was a puppet Turkic khagan installed by Wu Zetian in 685.

Life 
He was a son of Ashina Mishe. He was created commander of Kunling General-Protectorate and Xingxiwang Khagan by Wu Zetian, being assigned to his father's tribes. However, his lands soon invaded by Tibetan Empire and he was captured and held hostage by Tibetans since 686 till 689. Although he was released afterwards and went to Tang, he was falsely accused by Lai Junchen and executed by waist chopping, in 692 in Changan.

Family 
He had two sons:

 Ashina Tuizi - Rebelled, allied to Tibetan Empire, then submitted to Second Turkic Qaghanate.
 Ashina Xian - Xingxiwang Khagan (708-717)

References 

7th-century Turkic people
692 deaths
People executed by China
People executed by cutting in half
Ashina house of the Turkic Empire
Göktürk khagans